Eleanor Prescott Hammond (1866–1933) was an American scholar of English literature, particularly Chaucer studies. She studied at Oxford under Arthur Sampson Napier, earning her B.A. in 1894. She obtained a Ph.D. at the University of Chicago in 1898, then taught there in the English department before leaving to become a schoolteacher and independent scholar. She also taught at Wellesley College.

Her 1908 book, Chaucer: A Bibliographical Manual, as the first critical bibliography on Chaucer's works and scholarship, was foundational for Chaucerian scholarship in the twentieth century. Her identification of six manuscripts written by the same scribe, now known as the "Hammond Scribe", was extremely influential for the development of scribal identification in medieval English palaeography. Discoveries by A. I. Doyle, Richard Firth Green, Jeremy Griffiths, and Linne R. Mooney have since increased the total known manuscripts by this scribe to fifteen.

Selected works

References

External links 
Scribal profile of the Hammond Scribe 

1866 births
1933 deaths
Alumni of the University of Oxford
English literature academics
Chaucer scholars
University of Chicago alumni
Wellesley College faculty
University of Chicago faculty
University of Chicago fellows
American literary historians
American medievalists